The 2023 ACC Womens T20 Emerging Teams Asia Cup will be the inaugural edition of the ACC Womens T20 Emerging Team Asia Cup is scheduled to played in June to July 2023 host of the tournament yet to be confirmed. Eight teams are participating in the tournament, including four under-23 age level teams of Test nations and the top four associate ranked team. The tournament was organized by the Asian Cricket Council (ACC).

Participating teams 
The following eight teams will contest in the tournament.

Group summary

The teams were placed in the following groups.

References

Women's Twenty20 cricket international competitions
 Cricket in Asia